Valéria Faure-Muntian (born 2 September 1984) is a French politician of Renaissance who served as a member of the French National Assembly from 2017 to 2022, representing the 3rd constituency of the department of Loire.

Political career
In Parliament, Faure-Muntian served on the Committee on Foreign Affairs and the Parliamentary Office for the Evaluation of Scientific and Technological Choices (OPECST). In addition to her committee assignments, she chaired the French-Ukrainian Parliamentary Friendship Group. She was also part of the French delegation to the Parliamentary Assembly of the Black Sea Economic Cooperation.

Faure-Muntian did not seek re-election in the 2022 French legislative election.

Political positions
In July 2019, Faure-Muntian voted in favor of the French ratification of the European Union’s Comprehensive Economic and Trade Agreement (CETA) with Canada.

See also
 2017 French legislative election

References

1984 births
Living people
Deputies of the 15th National Assembly of the French Fifth Republic
La République En Marche! politicians
21st-century French women politicians
People from Kiliya
Women members of the National Assembly (France)
French people of Ukrainian descent
French people of Moldovan descent
Naturalized citizens of France
Politicians from Auvergne-Rhône-Alpes